The barony of Clanmorris is a barony in County Mayo, Ireland. It is also known as Crossboyne, and was formed from the Gaelic tuath of Conmhaícne Cúile Tuiredh.
The Baron Clanmorris title dates from 1800AD when it was created for John Bingham.

Parishes
The following are civil parishes within the barony of Clanmorris:
Balla
Crossboyne
Kilcolman
Kilvine 
Mayo Abbey  
Tagheen

Towns and villages
Balla
Claremorris
Mayo Abbey
Ballindine

See also
 Conmhaícne Cúile Tuiredh

References

External links
History of the Browne Family 
Local history site

Baronies of County Mayo
Articles on towns and villages in Ireland possibly missing Irish place names
Conmaicne Cuile Toladh